Thobela FM is the contemporary voice of Sepedi speaking/understanding South Africans.

Coverage and frequencies 
The station broadcasts in these areas and in FM on the following frequencies throughout South Africa.

Broadcast time
24/7

Target Audience
LSM Groups 4 – 8
Age Group 16 - 49

Programme Format
60% Music
40% Talk

Listenership Figures

References

External links
Thobela FM Website
SAARF Website
Sentech Website

Radio stations in South Africa